Xoruzlu (also, Khoruzlu) is a village and municipality in the Tartar Rayon of Azerbaijan.  It has a population of 1,400.

Notable natives 

 Vazir Orujov — National Hero of Azerbaijan.

References

External links

Populated places in Tartar District